The Tomatas are an extinct indigenous people that inhabited the valley of Tarija at the time of the Spanish founding of Tarija in 1574. The tomatas appear to have originated in the area of Copiapó in the Chilean Norte Chico as attested in the designation "tomatas copiapoes" found in early Spanish manuscripts. This group was likely uprooted from their homelands in Chile as part of the population transfers of the Inca Empire. Based on archaelogical remains, the Elqui Valley, about 240 km south of Copiapó Valley, has also been proposed as a possible origin.  Conquistador Luis de Fuentes, moved this group again yet a much shorter distance than the Incas did and resettled the Tomatas near his new city Tarija. The Tomatas appear to have given placenames from their old lands to their new area of settlement thus explaining the existence of "Chilean" placenames such as Loa, Calama, and Erqui (Elqui) in Bolivia.

References

Indigenous peoples in Bolivia
Tarija Department